The Kansai Pro Championship was a professional golf tournament in Japan. It was first played in 1931 and was an event on the Japan Golf Tour from 1973 to 1990. It was played in July at a variety of courses in Western Japan, around the Kansai region.

Winners
this list is incomplete
1990 Kōki Idoki
1989 Hajime Matsui
1988 Masahiro Kuramoto
1987 Yoshitaka Yamamoto
1986 Teruo Sugihara
1985 Keiichi Kobayashi
1984 Teruo Sugihara
1983 Yoshitaka Yamamoto
1982 Hideto Shigenobu
1981 Norio Suzuki
1980 Teruo Sugihara
1979 Tōru Nakamura
1978 Teruo Sugihara
1977 Kosaku Shimada
1976 Shinsaku Maeda
1975 Hiroshi Ishii
1974 Kosaku Shimada
1973 Kosaku Shimada
1972 Teruo Sugihara
1971 Toichiro Toda
1970 Teruo Sugihara
1969 Toichiro Toda
1968 Shiro Matsuda
1967 Teruo Sugihara
1966 Tadashi Kitta
1965 Teruo Sugihara
1964 Teruo Sugihara
1963 Susumu Arai
1962
1961 Shiro Matsuda
1960 Yousei Shimamura
1959
1958
1957 Tadashi Kitta
1956 Tetsuo Ishii
1955 Yousei Shimamura
1954 Yousei Shimamura
1953 Yousei Shimamura
1952
1951
1950
1949
1948
1943-47 No tournament
1942 Tomekichi Miyamoto
1941 Tomekichi Miyamoto
1940 Toichiro Toda
1939 Toichiro Toda
1938 Toichiro Toda
1937 Akira Muraki
1936 Toichiro Toda
1935
1934 Toichiro Toda
1933 Tomekichi Miyamoto
1932 Tomekichi Miyamoto
1931 Jiro Morioka

External links
Coverage on Japan Golf Tour's official site

Former Japan Golf Tour events
Defunct golf tournaments in Japan
Recurring sporting events established in 1931
Recurring sporting events disestablished in 1990